is a Japanese actor. Born in Dalian, Manchuria, he graduated from high school in Kitakyushu, Fukuoka Prefecture, Japan. A member of the 13th group of actors and actresses trained at the Haiyū-za, he counts Tetsuo Ishidate, Toshiyuki Hosokawa, Tomomi Satō, and Gō Katō as classmates. His older brother Shōji is a much-recorded guitarist, and his younger brother Hiroshi a composer. Tadashi belongs to TY Pro.

NHK tapped Yokouchi for the lead in the series "Tabiji," the 1967–68 morning drama.

Yokouchi's first major jidaigeki role was Atsumi Kakunoshin in the long-running "Mito Kōmon." He portrayed "Kaku-san" in the first eight series on TBS from 1969 to 1978. Fans remember his deep voice in the theme song as well. He made another appearance on the show in 2003 when the series celebrated its thousandth episode.

Another major jidaigeki role began in 1978 as Yokouchi played the historical Ōoka Tadasuke in Abarenbo Shogun (TV Asahi). Having created the role, he continued to portray the magistrate in the first seven series until 1997.

Two taiga drama roles have been his. He appeared in the 1980 Shishi no Jidai starring Bunta Sugawara, and as Shimizu Yoshimasa in the 2007 Fūrin Kazan, having been in the 1992  Nippon Television show of the same name.

A versatile talent, Yokouchi has also appeared in contemporary dramas, dubbed foreign productions, and voiced animated characters. He played Michio Kamakura, the lover of Sakura, in a television version of Otoko wa Tsurai yo. In Japan, fans of Cosmos: A Personal Voyage heard him as the voice of Carl Sagan. He also voiced Moog the Rock Giant in Hols: Prince of the Sun from Toei Animation (1968).

Yokouchi has appeared on variety programs and released a single.

Filmography

Films
Hols: Prince of the Sun (1969) - Moug the Rock Giant (voice)
Tora-san's Grand Scheme (1970) - Takao
Lensman: Secret of The Lens (1984) - Blond haired Lensman (voice)
Toki no Tabibito -Time Stranger- (1986) - Oda Nobunaga (voice)
Shizumanu Taiyō (2009) - Noboru Umino

Television
Mito Kōmon (TBS, 1969–78) - Kaku-san
The Unfettered Shogun (TV Asahi, 1978–1997) - Ōoka Tadasuke
Fūrin Kazan (NHK, 2007) - Shimizu Yoshimasa
Tenchijin (NHK, 2009) - Kobayakawa Takakage
Gunshi Kanbei (NHK, 2014) - Maeda Toshiie

Dubbing
The Black Hole (1984 Fuji TV edition) - Dr. Hans Reinhardt (Maximilian Schell)
Dallas - J.R. Ewing (Larry Hagman)
Lady Chatterley's Lover (1984 NTV edition) - Oliver Mellors (Nicholas Clay)
The Mystery of the Blue Train - Rufus Van Aldin (Elliott Gould)
The Phantom of the Opera - Sándor Korvin / The Phantom of the Opera (Maximilian Schell)
Rear Window (1986 TV Asahi edition) - NYPD Det. Lt. Thomas J. Doyle (Wendell Corey)

External links
TY Pro site

1941 births
Living people
Japanese male actors
Asadora lead actors